Jordi Balk (born 26 April 1994) is a retired Dutch professional footballer who played as a centre back during his career, for Ross County, FC Oss, St Patrick's Athletic, FC Lienden, VV DUNO, DOVO and Sportlust '46.

Club career

Ross County
Balk, who had previously played in the youth academy of Dutch club Utrecht, signed for Scottish Premiership club Ross County in July 2014. He made his debut appearance on 16 August 2014, in a 2–1 defeat against Kilmarnock. Balk was released from his contract in November 2014.

FC Oss
In January 2015, he signed with Dutch Eerste Divisie side FC Oss until the end of the season. He stayed with FC Oss until 2017.

St Patrick's Athletic
After 3 seasons with FC Oss, Balk went on trial with League of Ireland Premier Division club St Patrick's Athletic, from the capital city of Dublin. On 5 July 2017 he played the full 90 minutes as a trialist in a 1–0 friendly win over Scottish Premiership side Heart of Midlothian at Richmond Park. After impressing fans and coaching staff with his passing, positional sense and tackling, Balk signed a contract with the Saints on 7 July 2017, becoming the first Dutch player to play for the club. Balk made his full debut on 9 July in a narrow 1–0 defeat away to league leaders Cork City. He scored his first goal in the clubs crucial 4-2 win against Cork which helped St Pats stay in League of Ireland Premier Division.

Return to Holland
On 19 December, Balk announced to his fans via his Instagram account that despite St Patrick's Athletic offering him a multi-year contract, he would be leaving Dublin and returning home to sign for FC Lienden of the Tweede Divisie on a 1.5 year contract.

Balk signed with Voetbalvereniging Duno Doorwerth, better known as VV DUNO, in the beginning of 2019. However, already on 12 February 2019 it was confirmed, that Balk would join DOVO from the upcoming season.

Balk played for Sportlust '46 from 2020 until he retired from football in July 2022.

Career statistics

References

 https://www.irishmirror.ie/sport/soccer/soccer-news/relegation-threatened-st-pats-were-11729219
 https://www.dublinlive.ie/sport/liam-buckley-praises-jordi-balk-14075897
 https://www.gelderlander.nl/voetbal-arnhem/jordi-balk-van-schotland-ierland-en-lienden-naar-duno-in-doorwerth~af821231/
 https://www.elfvoetbal.nl/Avonturiers/270135/Zo-wil-Jordi-Balk-via-Ierland-zijn-Engelse-droom-waarmaken
 https://www.the42.ie/jordi-balk-league-of-ireland-st-patricks-athletic-3617685-Sep2017/

External links
 Profile - Voetbal International
 
 VV Duno profile

1994 births
Living people
People from Wijk bij Duurstede
Dutch footballers
Association football defenders
Scottish Professional Football League players
Ross County F.C. players
Dutch expatriate footballers
Expatriate footballers in Scotland
Dutch expatriate sportspeople in Scotland
TOP Oss players
Eerste Divisie players
St Patrick's Athletic F.C. players
Tweede Divisie players
FC Lienden players
VV DOVO players
Sportlust '46 players
League of Ireland players
Expatriate association footballers in the Republic of Ireland
Footballers from Utrecht (province)